Bongor is a city in Chad, the capital of the region of Mayo-Kebbi Est. It is located on the eastern bank of the Logone River. During the rainy season (May–September), the Logone is navigable between Bongor and N'Djamena, Chad's capital. The population is 29,268 (2008).

Bongor has a lively central market square, an airport, a post office, a hospital, and the administrative offices for the Mayo-Kebbi Prefecture.  Cotton and rice are the primary cash crops of the region. There is a  hotel on the bank of the Logone. The principal market day is Monday and people come from the entire region for the weekly market.

Bongor was a part of German Cameroon until the 1911 German-French Treaty. In 1904, a military station was founded near Bongor by German colonial officer Herbert Kund, constituting the beginning of the city's modern history. The primary indigenous tribal group are the Masa people. The city has been an important centre of secondary education since colonial times. The Lycée Jacques Modeina is located in the city and many of the future leaders of the nations that became independent after the dissolution of the colony of French Equatorial Africa attended the Lycée.

Climate

Demographics

References

Populated places in Chad
Cameroon–Chad border crossings
Mayo-Kebbi Est Region